The Ministry of Transport and Communications (MTC;) is the government department of East Timor accountable for transport, communications, and related matters.

Functions
The Ministry is responsible for the design, implementation, coordination and evaluation of policy for the following areas:

 transport; and
 communications.

Additionally, the Ministry is responsible for the proposal and implementation of its policy lines in the transport and communications sectors.

Minister
The incumbent Minister of Transport and Communications  is José Agustinho da Silva. He is assisted by Merício Juvenal dos Reis "Akara", Secretary of State for Communications.

See also 
 List of ministries of communications
 List of ministries of transport by country
 Politics of East Timor

References

External links

  – official site  

East Timor
Transport and Communications
East Timor
East Timor, Transport and Communications
1975 establishments in East Timor